Gambelia is a genus of lizards, commonly known as leopard lizards, within the family Crotaphytidae. Leopard lizards are indigenous to arid environments of southwestern North America.

Species in the genus Gambelia superficially resemble those of the genus Crotaphytus. However, one difference between the genera Gambelia and Crotaphytus is that leopard lizards have fracture planes in their tails, allowing the tails to break off when grasped by predators.

Etymology
The generic name, Gambelia, is in honor of American naturalist William Gambel.

Species
Three species are recognized.

Nota bene: A binomial authority in parentheses indicates that the species was originally described in a genus other than Gambelia.

References

Further reading

Baird SF (1859). United States and Mexican Boundary Survey, Under the Order of Lieu. Col. W.H. Emory, Major First Cavalry, and United States Commissioner. [Volume 2, Part 2]. Reptiles of the Boundary, with Notes by the Naturalists of the Survey. Washington, District of Columbia: Department of the Interior. 35 pp. + Plates I-XLI. (Gambelia, new genus, p. 7).
Smith HM, Brodie ED Jr (1982). Reptiles of North America: A Guide to Field Identification. New York: Golden Press. 240 pp. . (Genus Gambelia, p. 108).

Gambelia
Lizard genera
Taxa named by Spencer Fullerton Baird